Losna was the Etruscan moon goddess. She is also associated with the oceans and the tides. She is similar to Greek Leucothea. Losna's Roman equivalent is Luna.

See also
Luna (goddess)

References

Etruscan goddesses
Lunar goddesses